Madam Secretary (subtitled Madam President for its sixth and final season) is an American political drama television series created by Barbara Hall with Morgan Freeman and Lori McCreary as executive producers. It stars Téa Leoni as Elizabeth McCord, a former CIA analyst and political science professor who becomes the United States Secretary of State. It ran on CBS from September 21, 2014, to December 8, 2019, for a total of 120 episodes aired. The series was renewed for a final 10-episode sixth season in May 2019, which premiered October 6, 2019.

Premise
The first five seasons of Madam Secretary explore Elizabeth McCord's life as the determined United States Secretary of State. She drives international diplomacy, battles office politics, and circumvents protocol if needed as she negotiates worldwide issues. The show also focuses on the characters' personal lives. At the end of the fifth season, McCord announces that she will run for president. As the sixth season begins, the audience learns that she has won the election, and the remainder of the series follows her as America's first female president.

Cast and characters

Main
 Téa Leoni as Elizabeth "Bess" Adams McCord, the President of the United States and former Secretary of State. She spent twenty years as a CIA analyst before becoming a professor of political science at the University of Virginia. She was appointed by her old boss, Conrad Dalton, who was then the president of the United States, to replace Secretary of State Vincent Marsh, who died in a plane crash. She succeeded Dalton as president.
 Tim Daly as Henry McCord, Elizabeth's husband of 25 years and now First Gentleman of the United States. A theology professor and a former Marine captain/aviator during Operation Desert Storm, his unique blend of skills are sought by the National Security Agency, which engages him as an operative in combating religious extremism. At the end of the third season, Henry is named the head of the CIA Special Activities Division.
 Bebe Neuwirth as Nadine Tolliver (seasons 1–4), Elizabeth's chief of staff who had a six-year affair with the deceased Secretary of State, Vincent Marsh, beginning when he was a senator. Originally suspicious and resentful of the new Secretary of State, Nadine soon learns to trust Elizabeth, and the two cultivate a strong working relationship. In the first season, Nadine slowly begins to date again, romancing NASA Administrator Glenn, and later falls into a relationship with the recurring political consultant Mike Barnow. In the fourth season, Nadine's son Roman tells her she is going to be a grandmother and she retires from the State Department and moves to San Francisco to spend more time with her family.
 Željko Ivanek as Russell Jackson, White House Chief of Staff. His primary objective of keeping the President politically secure at home and abroad sets him up for occasional confrontations with Secretary McCord's unorthodox diplomatic maneuvering. Elizabeth then appoints him as her White House Chief of Staff 98 days into her presidency.
 Erich Bergen as Blake Moran, Elizabeth's personal assistant, and the only member of her staff that she hired rather than inherited. After college, he began a career in finance on Wall Street, but hated it. In the fifth season, Elizabeth made good on her promise to fire him, only to rehire him as her new assistant policy advisor.
 Patina Miller as Daisy Grant, Elizabeth's press coordinator. Daisy briefly dates Matt in the first season but goes on to date other men following their breakup. In the third season, she dates "Kevin" from Budget and Planning, who turns out to be an undercover operative for the CIA investigating the State Department. He is killed in a weapons-trafficking conspiracy, and Daisy subsequently finds herself pregnant with his child. (The storyline was used to incorporate Miller's real-life pregnancy.) In the fourth season, Daisy gives birth to her daughter Joanna Grant.
 Geoffrey Arend as Matt Mahoney, Elizabeth's speechwriter. Matt briefly dates Daisy in the first season.
 Wallis Currie-Wood as Stephanie "Stevie" McCord, Elizabeth and Henry's older daughter and first-born child. Stevie attended Lovell University and later Georgetown University and applied to Harvard Law School. Stevie serves as an intern to Russell Jackson and was, for a time, engaged to Jareth Glover. She has a secret relationship with Dmitri Petrov (then undercover) in the fourth season that puts her in peril.
 Kathrine Herzer as Alison McCord, Elizabeth and Henry's younger daughter.
 Evan Roe as Jason McCord, Elizabeth and Henry's teenage son and youngest child, a self-proclaimed anarchist. Jason is critical of political systems in general, but in the first season, he is expelled from his school for punching a student who insulted Elizabeth. He eventually dates Piper Boroumand.
 Keith Carradine as Conrad Dalton (seasons 2–6; recurring season 1), the President of the United States. Conrad served in the United States Marine Corps as a second lieutenant during the Vietnam War and was the Director of the Central Intelligence Agency during Elizabeth's time at the CIA. In the third season, Dalton secures reelection as an independent after failing to secure his party's nomination, partly due to a controversial change in policy championed by Elizabeth. He offers Elizabeth the role of Vice President during his campaign, but eventually names Teresa Hurst in order to further his campaign. Elizabeth remains the Secretary of State.
 Sebastian Arcelus as Jay Whitman (seasons 3–6; recurring seasons 1–2), Elizabeth's current chief of staff and previous senior policy advisor. In the third season, it is revealed that Jay's busy schedule working for the Secretary has strained his marriage. He separates from his wife Abby, who maintains custody of their daughter Chloe. Jay is promoted to chief of staff in the fourth season after Nadine Tolliver leaves. In the fifth season, while stuck at an airport with Elizabeth and her staff, Jay meets Annelies De Runnow (Marissa Neitling), a world-famous chess player, and they develop an attraction to each other. After several hours stuck in the airport, Jay and Annelies agree to start a long-distance relationship. Although Elizabeth eventually decides to run for president (a campaign she eventually wins), Jay decides to leave her campaign and pass on the chance to become her chief of staff to start a life with Annelies. When Elizabeth becomes president, she hires Jay as her chief of staff after Russell Jackson retires.
 Sara Ramirez as Kat Sandoval (seasons 4–5), Elizabeth's policy advisor and a former chief of staff to the UN Ambassador.
 Kevin Rahm as Michael "Mike B." Barnow (season 6; recurring seasons 1–5), a political operator who is said to drift between the United States Cabinet departments. It is mentioned that he is a Rhodes Scholar, who turned his brilliant legal career into a promising political career that was cut short by a scandalous divorce six years prior to his first appearance before settling into his current job. His unofficial role as an adviser to Secretary McCord earned him a reputation as her 'hatchet man'. Elizabeth later appoints him as the campaign manager of her successful presidential campaign and, after her victory in the 2020 election, he serves as her White House Chief of Staff for her first 100 days. Although Elizabeth asks him to remain as chief of staff, he refuses but remains at the White House as a Counselor to the President. Mike was rarely seen without his dog Gordon before its death in latter half of Season 5.

Recurring
 Johanna Day as Ellen Hill, a retired admiral and the National Security Advisor. She was the first female Chair of the Joint Chiefs of Staff prior to being appointed National Security Advisor.
 Tony Plana as Ed Parker, an admiral and member of the Joint Chiefs of Staff
 Francis Jue as Ming Chen, China's Foreign Minister and Elizabeth's Chinese counterpart
 Mandy Gonzalez as Lucy Knox, President Dalton's aide
 Mike Pniewski as Gordon Becker, the United States Secretary of Defense
 Jason Ralph as Harrison Dalton (seasons 1–2), son of President Dalton and long-time friend of Stevie McCord. In the first season, it is revealed Harrison has a drug addiction and is color blind. In the fourth season, it is revealed that he is back in rehab.
 Matt Meinsen as Matt (seasons 1–5), Elizabeth's lead security detail
 Cotter Smith as Darren Hahn (seasons 1–2), President Dalton's first known National Security Advisor
 Patrick Breen as Andrew Munsey (season 1), the Director of the CIA and a protégé of President Dalton.
 Nilaja Sun as Juliet Humphrey (season 1; guest season 3), a former CIA analyst, friend and colleague of Elizabeth and Isabelle.
 Usman Ally as Zahed Javani (season 1), Iran's Foreign Minister and Elizabeth's Iranian counterpart
 Dion Graham as Fred Cole (season 1), the Bureau of Diplomatic Security head agent who served as Elizabeth's principal bodyguard
 Josh Hamilton as Arthur Gilroy (season 1), Stevie's 39-year-old microloan employer and ex-boyfriend
 Anna Deavere Smith as Mary Campbell (season 1), the United States Attorney General
 Marin Hinkle as Isabelle Barnes (season 1), a CIA analyst and Elizabeth's close friend, who assists the McCords with the investigation of the death of Secretary of State Vincent Marsh
 Yorgo Constantine as Anton Gorev (seasons 1–2), Russia's Foreign Minister and a friend of both Secretary and Dr. McCord
 Clifton Davis as Ephraim Ware (seasons 2–6), Director of National Intelligence
 Julian Acosta as Craig Sterling (season 2), a former US Department of Defense official who becomes National Security Advisor in the second season, much to Elizabeth and Russell's dismay, and a rival of Elizabeth's
 Alex Fernandez as Mark Delgado (season 2), the Vice President of the United States
 Angela Gots as Maria Ostrova (season 2), the President of Russia and widow of late Russian President Pavel Ostrov
 Leslie Hendrix as Louise Cronenberg (season 2), the United States Attorney General
 Jill Hennessy as Jane Fellows (season 2), Henry's DIA superior, and a member of Murphy Station; the first Hizb-al Shahid task force
 Kobi Libii as Oliver Shaw (season 2; guest season 3), the Cybersecurity Coordinator. Shaw looked into the attack against Air Force One and is the love interest of Daisy Grant in the second season.
 Chris Petrovski as Dmitri Petrov (seasons 2, 4; guest seasons 3, 5–6), a 24-year-old Russian Army captain who studied at the National War College. He was recruited by Professor Henry McCord (on behalf of the DIA) to become an American spy in exchange for getting his sick sister medical care in Stockholm, Sweden. Dmitri is captured by the Russians and eventually exchanged to the Americans for another traitor to the state. Following his capture Dmitri feels abandoned by Henry and is very angry and bitter toward him. He is placed into a witness protection program under the name Alexander (Alex) Mehranov. In the fourth season, he is recruited by the CIA as an analyst.
 Masha King as Talia Petrov, Dmitri's sister who was placed into witness protection with her brother and is now his roommate
 Carlos Gómez as Jose Campos (seasons 2–3), an Hizb-al Shahid task force member. Initially had a combative relationship with Henry McCord but they eventually became friends.
 Tonya Pinkins as Susan Thompson (seasons 3–6), Assistant Secretary for the Bureau of African Affairs and, as of the end of the fifth season, Acting Secretary of State and later Secretary of State in the McCord Administration. Assistant Secretary Thompson is a key voice in bringing African issues to the leadership's attention, such as encouraging the Secretary to intervene in the Angolan election in the third season.
 J. C. MacKenzie as Sam Evans (season 3), the governor of Pennsylvania and the presidential nominee for Dalton's party. Evans is particularly vindictive during the campaign and, following Dalton's victory through a vote in the House of Representatives, threatens to have the vote overturned due to a little-known law he claims Elizabeth broke. However, he is manipulated into accepting the terms of the vote after Russel Jackson threatens to expose him for having a gene that makes him likely to develop early-onset Alzheimer's. 
 René Auberjonois as Walter Novack (seasons 2–6), a State Department analyst with the Bureau of International Security and Nonproliferation.
 Christopher O'Shea as Jareth Glover, Stevie's fiancé from England. He gave up a fellowship at Oxford to return to America to be with Stevie after she had trouble adjusting to life in England. His family is a member of the upper class and even nobility in England. Stevie and Jareth broke up in the fourth season.
 Justine Lupe as Ronnie Baker (seasons 3–6), a United States Army captain seconded from United States Cyber Command who assists Elizabeth on several occasions
 Eric Stoltz as Will Adams, Secretary Elizabeth McCord's younger brother and a member of Doctors Without Borders
 Jordan Lage as Kohl, a United States Army general
 Sam Breslin Wright as Dylan Larson, an ex–Army Ranger who has been working for the CIA for seven years as of the start of the fourth season
 Christine Garver as Molly Reid, a career CIA agent, starting her career as a field agent in Chechnya. She is pregnant and due in a couple months from the start of the fourth season.
Tracee Chimo as Nina Cummings, Secretary McCord's assistant who takes over after Blake vacating the position. In season six she moves to the White House as Russell's assistant.
Wentworth Miller as Senator Hanson, who leads the congressional investigation into poll fraud accusations on President McCord's campaign.

Presidential Cabinets and principal advisors

Other officials

Episodes

Production

Development
In August 2013, it was announced Madam Secretary was in development at CBS, co-written by Barbara Hall. Madam Secretary is about "the personal and professional life of a maverick female secretary of state, as she drives international diplomacy, wrangles office politics and balances a complex family life."

The pilot was directed by David Semel. On May 9, 2014, Madam Secretary received a series order at CBS. A preview trailer was released on May 14, 2014. Madam Secretary premiered on CBS on September 21, 2014, and on October 27, 2014, CBS picked up the series for a full season of 22 episodes. Madam Secretary was renewed for a sixth season on May 9, 2019. On May 15, 2019, it was announced the sixth season would be the series' final season and would comprise 10 episodes. It premiered on October 6, 2019. Filming for the series was completed on November 13, 2019.

Casting
In January 2014, the pilot was cast with Téa Leoni as Elizabeth McCord, Tim Daly as Henry McCord, Geoffrey Arend as Matt Mahoney, Patina Miller as press coordinator Daisy Grant, Bebe Neuwirth as Elizabeth's chief of staff Nadine Tolliver, Erich Bergen as Blake Moran, Evan Roe as Elizabeth's son, Jason McCord, Katherine Herzer as Elizabeth and Henry's daughter Alison McCord, Željko Ivanek as Russell Jackson, and Wallis Currie-Wood as Elizabeth and Henry's older daughter Stephanie "Stevie" McCord.

Bebe Neuwirth left the series after the third episode of the fourth season. Sara Ramirez joined the cast as Kat Sandoval, replacing Bebe Neuwirth as a series regular. Hall said, "She brings a fresh perspective and a fun, energetic quality to the State Department staff."

On August 6, 2019, it was revealed that Ramirez would not return as a regular for the sixth and final season. Nearly a month later on September 3, it was revealed that original regulars Arend, Roe, and Herzer, and later additions Keith Carradine and Sebastian Arcelus would also be dropped from the main cast; however, Carradine was expected to make at least one guest appearance, and the others would likely appear according to their work schedules. Additionally, Kevin Rahm, who had recurred as McCord's advisor Michael "Mike B." Barnow since the second half of the first season, would be upgraded to regular status.

Broadcast
As of May 15, 2020, all six seasons of Madam Secretary are available on Netflix (US). In Finland, Madam Secretary premiered on MTV3 on January 1, 2015. The series has been popular in Finland: 9% of Finnish people watched the first episode.

Reception

Ratings

 Note: In seasons four through six during the fall, the series was scheduled to air at 10:30p.m. ET/9:30p.m. CT to allow for football and golf overruns (there were no delays from Mountain Time westward). Since its move to the last hour of primetime, this resulted in several new episodes being delayed a week at the last minute due to a game's overrunning, to allow CBS affiliate local newscasts to start as close to 11:00p.m. ET/ 10:00p.m. CT as possible; in this case, a repeat aired in the Mountain Time Zone westward instead, with Canadian broadcaster Global following CBS's scheduling in order to take advantage of simsub advertising opportunities.

Critical reception
Madam Secretary has been met with generally positive reviews from TV critics. On Metacritic, the show has a score of 66 out of 100, based on 31 critics, indicating "generally favorable reviews". On Rotten Tomatoes, the show holds a rating of 67% based on reviews from 52 critics. The site's consensus for the first season reads, "Bolstered by Tea Leoni's strong central performance, Madam Secretary is a solid but unspectacular political drama."

Three former US Secretaries of State apparently were fans of the series. On April 27, 2022, during a eulogy at the memorial service for Madeleine Albright (Secretary of State from 1997 to 2001), Hillary Clinton (Secretary of State from 2009 to 2013), disclosed that she and Secretaries Albright and Colin Powell (Secretary of State from 2001 to 2005), "loved and actually watched" Madam Secretary. All three former Secretaries of State made a cameo appearance together on the fifth-season premiere, which aired on October 7, 2018.

Criticism
Three women have served as Secretary of State to date: Madeleine Albright from 1997 to 2001 under Bill Clinton, Condoleezza Rice from 2005 to 2009 under George W. Bush, and Hillary Clinton from 2009 to 2013 under Barack Obama. Shortly after the series' debut, Fox News asked if the show served as a campaign ad supporting Hillary Clinton, but quoted the Los Angeles Times saying the lead character was "no Hillary knock-off" and a New York publicist calling the casting of a woman "simple business and smart on CBS' behalf." Conservative activist organization Culture and Media Institute said "The connections in the show between Elizabeth and Hillary are clear, from the blond hair to the pantsuits."

When the trailer of the fifteenth episode of the third season titled "Break in Diplomacy" was released showing McCord responding to unwanted sexual advances by fictional Philippine president Datu Andrada by punching Andrada in the face, it became controversial in the Philippines. Viewers thought there were parallels between Andrada and real-life Philippine President Rodrigo Duterte, who was known for making inappropriate and sexist remarks. The Philippine Embassy in Washington published a statement protesting the negative depiction of the presidential character on its Facebook page.

The fourth-season premiere, "News Cycle", led to a protest from East Timor's Minister of State José Ramos-Horta, a Nobel Peace Prize laureate. He said, "It is a slander against a country that only shows ignorance and racism." The TV show used the border dispute between Australia and East Timor in the Timor Sea as background story. (The dispute is transferred in the TV show to the South China Sea, although neither Australia nor East Timor borders it.) East Timor is shown as a country controlled by a Mexican drug cartel and used for drug transfer. US Secretary of State McCord is asking China to take measures to prevent the leader of the drug cartel from making a narco-state out of East Timor.

In the 4th episode of the first season, "Just Another Normal Day", the director used footage shot in Hoi An, Vietnam but noted the location of Fuling, China. Soon after, it caused the anger of the Vietnamese government and people, because the episode "offended Vietnam's sovereignty and territorial integrity". Soon after, the Department of Radio, Television and Electronic Information of the Ministry of Information and Communications of Vietnam ordered a ban on Madam Secretary and asked Netflix to remove the series from the Vietnamese version of Netflix.

Accolades

References

External links

 
2010s American drama television series
2010s American LGBT-related drama television series
2010s American political television series
2014 American television series debuts
2019 American television series endings
American political drama television series
CBS original programming
Television series about the Central Intelligence Agency
English-language television shows
Television series by CBS Studios
Television series created by Barbara Hall (TV producer)
Television shows set in Washington, D.C.
White House in fiction
Works about diplomats